George Savalla Gomes, better known as Carequinha or Baldy the Clown (July 18, 1915 in Rio Bonito – April 5, 2006 in São Gonçalo), was a Brazilian clown and actor, born in a circus to a circus family. He had a thick head of hair, but wore a bald wig, starting from five years old – he was a clown in Circus Ocidental until the age of twelve.  He was the first Brazilian clown to have his own TV show – Circo Bombril, later called Circus Carequinha ran for 16 years.

Filmography

Notes

External links
Carequinha site at Retrotv.uol.com.br

1915 births
2006 deaths
People from Rio Bonito, Rio de Janeiro
Brazilian clowns
Brazilian male actors